Paristan is a Pakistani Ramadan special television drama series produced by Momina Duraid under banner MD Productions, directed by Ali Hassan and written by Samra Bukhari. It stars Arslan Naseer and Aymen Saleem in lead roles with an ensemble cast of Javeria Saud, Naveen Waqar, Ali Safina, Mira Sethi, Merub Ali, Junaid Jamshed Niazi and Asad Siddiqui in supporting roles and YouTuber Taimoor Salahuddin in his television debut. It broadcasts daily on Hum TV, starting from 3 April 2022.

Plot 

The story is about a girl whose name is Pernia (nicknamed Pari), her parents died when she was very young, so she lives with her aunt Haseena and uncle Saife Hassan and her sweet cousin Ujala. Pari is a daydreamer , she always dreams of becoming rich and is very bubbly. She is best friends with her neighbor Kamali who's also funny like her. The family has a maid , named Zubeida whose mother tongue is Punjabi and she can do all house chores but cannot cook ,so all the cooking is done by Ujala , Ujala is a very kind-hearted and sweet person , who loves pari like her own sister. Meanwhile Pari's aunt Haseena is a big miser and is always worried about the expenses. The father of the family has a little sister called Mehreen who doesn't trust men . They have a cute cousin named Babar.

Meanwhile there is another character named Arsam , Arsam was a very happy person living with his brother and his brother's wife and his grandmother (daadi), until his brother and his wife died while coming from a family function in a car crash, afterwards Arsam becomes a strict and cold hearted person , he becomes rude to his brother's children who are very little and naughty. His grandmother tells him to be patient and let go of the past, but he never forgets the past. The family has a servant named Amanullah who's very funny.They shift to their family home next to Pari's home, and this All gives rise to the start of something unique,lively, happy and funny, altogether.

Cast 

 Arslan Naseer as Arsam
 Aymen Saleem as Pernia "Pari"
 Javeria Saud as Haseena
 Naveen Waqar as Mehreen
 Ali Safina as Kumail "Kamali"
 Mira Sethi as Zubeida
 Merub Ali as Ujala
 Washma Fatima as Shahzeen
 Junaid Jamshed Niazi as Babar
 Asad Siddiqui as Azar
 Taimoor Salahuddin as Amanullah
 Azra Mansoor as Arsam's Grandmother
 Saima Qureshi as Rukhsar
 Saife Hassan as Ishaq, Haseena's Husband and Ujala's father

Production 
In January 2022, it revealed that Chupke Chupke  couple Aymen Saleem and Arslan Naseer will appear in upcoming Ramadan series. Besides Saleem and Naseer, Javeria Saud, Naveen Waqar, Mira Sethi and Ali Safina were also cast in prominent roles. In February, it reported that YouTuber and content creator, Taimoor Salahuddin aka Mooroo has also joined the cast and will paired opposite Sethi, Mooroo will made his television debut by this series and portray the character that he has co-created with Sethi.

Soundtrack

Reception 
The series received high ratings throughout its run in comparison to its rivals, with TRPs of 3–5 since its inception. With mixed reviews towards the story, the series received poor reviews from critics due to Javeria Suad's performance as Haseena, especially her Punjabi language accent. The News however gave a more favourable review, praised the storyline and also didn't criticize the Suad's performance stating, "due to the light-hearted nature of Ramazan dramas, the over-the-top acting works well...". Mira Sethi's performance as Zubeida was however praised.

References 

2022 Pakistani television series debuts